R/S RocketShip, formerly M/V Delta Mariner, is a cargo ship operated by Keystone Shipping Company for United Launch Alliance (ULA). Her primary role is transporting components for the ULA Atlas V, Delta IV and Vulcan rockets from the manufacturer, located in Decatur, Alabama, to launch facilities at Cape Canaveral Space Force Station in Florida and Vandenberg Space Force Base in California.

The ship is designed for shallow inland waterways as well as the open ocean and is capable of carrying up to three  Delta IV Common Booster Cores. Some cargos carried by RocketShip were formerly transported by an Antonov An-124 Ruslan from the manufacturer to the launch site.

History 

Use of Delta Mariner was transferred to ULA after the company was created in 2006 to handle all United States military launch services. ULA is a 50/50 joint venture created out of the rocket manufacturing and launch service businesses of Boeing and Lockheed Martin for their Delta and Atlas V launch vehicles, respectively. For ULA, the ship has transported the Atlas V, Delta IV and Delta II rockets under the Delta Mariner livery.

On September 27, 2019, United Launch Alliance re-christened the vessel RocketShip in a ceremony at its factory in Decatur.

Shipping routes 

Incidents

Grounding 
On August 7, 2001, Delta Mariner ran aground on a sandbar in the Tennessee River during its initial docking attempt at Decatur. This was Delta Mariners first arrival at the dock since its launch. The vessel was freed by a tugboat about an hour after the incident.

Bridge collision 

On January 26, 2012, around 20:10 CST, Delta Mariner struck the Eggner's Ferry Bridge, which crosses Kentucky Lake near Murray and Cadiz, Kentucky. There were no injuries on the ship or bridge, and, while Delta Mariner was "not severely damaged" and the cargo of Atlas and Centaur stages was undamaged, the collision destroyed a  section of the bridge.

According to Foss Maritime's spokesman, this was on the regular route taken by the vessel. U.S. Coast Guard officials state the vessel was operating in a recreational channel at the time of the collision, rather than the shipping channel which offers greater bridge clearance. Foss representatives stated that the bridge's channel navigation lights were not operational, though Kentucky Transportation Cabinet (KYTC) Secretary Mike Hancock stated this should not have been a significant factor in the incident and KYTC spokesman Keith Todd said he believes most of the lights were functioning at the time.

The ship remained anchored at the bridge after the incident took place so that salvage plans could be developed and equipment moved into place. Salvage operations were led by T&T Bisso of Houston, with assistance from local and regional companies. During February 4–5, salvage divers worked to remove debris which caught underwater on Delta Mariners hull. On February 6, the vessel was freed from the underwater debris and the Coast Guard approved its relocation to a safe harbor one mile downriver so that its bow could be cleared. By February 14, the bridge debris had been cleared and the vessel had relocated to the James Marine drydock in Paducah, Kentucky, to undergo repairs. Delta Mariner was cleared by the American Bureau of Shipping on February 17 to proceed on its journey, and it docked at Port Canaveral, Florida, on February 23.

In their investigation, the National Transportation Safety Board concluded that "the bridge team's exclusive reliance on the contract pilot's incorrect navigational direction as the vessel approached the bridge and their failure to use all available navigation tools to verify the safety of the vessel's course" was the cause of the incident, noting that the bridge crew ignored two Coast Guard broadcasts and a radio call from the vessel Addi Bell regarding navigational lights being out at the bridge. The NTSB cited the KYTC's failure to maintain the bridge's navigational lighting as a contributing factor; white navigation lights had been out of service for over a year and additional navigation lights indicating the bridge's high point had shorted out in the days leading up to the incident.

The bridge reopened on May 25, 2012. In 2017, Foss Maritime agreed to pay  to the KYTC as settlement in the incident.

Gallery

References

External links 

1999 ships
Ships built in Moss Point, Mississippi
Ro-ro ships
Maritime vessels related to spaceflight
Merchant ships of the United States
Maritime incidents in 2012